The Doha Golf Club in Doha, Qatar is an 18-hole, 7,374-yard, par 72 championship course that was designed by Peter Harradine. The Doha Golf Club is also one of the first grass golf course ever built in the Middle East. Open to nonmembers, it has a 2 808 yards long floodlit nine-hole academy course, and a clubhouse with three restaurants and a golf shop.

The club hosts the Qatar Masters golf tournament.

Past Directors of Golf

Gary McGlinchey
Greg Holmes
David Moreland

Geography

The Doha Golf Club is located in Al Egla, a northern district of Qatar's capital Doha which is just north of West Bay.

Features

Qatar Golf Academy

Clubhouse

The Doha Golf Club also has a clubhouse.

Courses

The Doha Golf Club was designed with eight strategically positioned lakes, 65 giant cacti which were imported from the deserts of Arizona, more than 10 000 green trees and shrubs, numerous limestone formations and an abundance of lush and lengthy fairways, which were all designed to present a startling contrast to the desert that surrounds this green golf club.

See also
Sport in Qatar

References

External links
Official Website

Golf
Golf clubs and courses in Qatar